Human Zoo is the tenth album by Detroit rock band Electric Six. It was released on October 14, 2014.

Track listing

Personnel
 Dick Valentine - lead vocals
  - lead guitar, backing vocals, bass
 Da Vé - rhythm guitar
 Tait Nucleus? - keyboards
 Smorgasboard - bass
 Percussion World - drums
 Kristin Von B. - backing vocals

Legacy
 Three songs recorded and originally intended for inclusion on "Human Zoo"; "Fucking In Another Man's Clothes", "Suitcases" and "WikiLeaks", were ultimately omitted from the album but subsequently released on compilation album "Mimicry and Memories".
 Dick Valentine recorded an acoustic version of "Alone With Your Body" for his solo album "Quiet Time".
 "I'm the Devil" was featured in the band's mockumentary feature film "Roulette Stars of Metro Detroit".
 The band performed "(Who the Hell Just) Call My Phone?" and "The Afterlife" on their second live album "You're Welcome!".
 The band performed a stripped down, acoustic version of "(Who the Hell Just) Call My Phone?" on their third live album Chill Out!.

References

External links
Electricsixnews

2014 albums
Electric Six albums
Metropolis Records albums